Teodoras is a Lithuanian masculine given name. It is a cognate of the name Theodore. People bearing the name Teodoras include:
Teodoras Četrauskas (born 1944), Lithuanian writer and literary translator
Teodoras Daukantas (1884–1960), Lithuanian military officer, former Lithuanian Minister of Defense
Teodoras Karijotaitis (13??–1414), Ruthenian prince, Lithuanian nobleman
Teodoras Skuminavičius (16??–1668), Bishop of Vilnius

References

Lithuanian masculine given names